Emily Dorothy Scarborough (January 27, 1878 – November 7, 1935) was an American writer who wrote about Texas, folk culture, cotton farming, ghost stories and women's life in the Southwest.

Early life
Scarborough was born in Mount Carmel, Texas. At the age of four she moved to Sweetwater, Texas for her mother's health, as her mother needed the drier climate. The family soon left Sweetwater in 1887, so that the Scarborough children could get a good education at Baylor College.

Academics and writing
Even though Scarborough's writings are identified with Texas, she studied at University of Chicago and Oxford University and, beginning in 1916, taught literature at Columbia University.

While receiving her PhD from Columbia, she wrote a dissertation, "The Supernatural in Modern English Fiction". Sylvia Ann Grider writes in a critical introduction that the dissertation "was so widely acclaimed by her professors and colleagues that it was published and it has become a basic reference work".

Dorothy Scarborough came in contact with many writers in New York, including Edna Ferber and Vachel Lindsay. She taught creative writing classes at Columbia. Among her creative writing students were Eric Walrond and Carson McCullers, who took her first college writing class from Scarborough.

Her most critically acclaimed book, The Wind (first published anonymously in 1925), was later made into a film of the same name starring Lillian Gish.

Bibliography

Original works

 Fugitive Verses (1912), original verses
 The Supernatural in Modern English Fiction (1917); available in its entirety at Google Book Search
 From a Southern Porch (1919), viewable in full at Google Book Search or viewable at the Portal to Texas History
 Humorous Ghost Stories (1921)  Free download from Project Gutenberg
 In the Land of Cotton (1923)
 The Wind (1925), considered her most acclaimed work.
 The Unfair Sex (serialized, 1925–26)
 Impatient Griselda (1927)
 Can't Get a Redbird (1929)
 Stretch-Berry Smile (1932)
 The Story of Cotton (1933) juvenile reader
 Selected Short Stories of Today (1935)

Folklore
 On the Trail of Negro Folk-songs (1925)  available at archive.org
 Song Catcher in Southern Mountains; American Folk Songs of British Ancestry (1937, posthumous)

Biographical and critical essays
Biographical Essay on the Handbook of Texas Online
Foreword to The Wind by Sylvia Ann Grider, Barker Texas History Center series, University of Texas Press, 1979.

References

Sources

External links
 
 
 
Dorothy Scarborough at the University of Houston site

1878 births
1935 deaths
20th-century American novelists
American women novelists
Novelists from Texas
People from Smith County, Texas
People from Sweetwater, Texas
University of Chicago alumni
Alumni of the University of Oxford
Columbia University alumni
Columbia University faculty
20th-century American women writers
Novelists from New York (state)
American women academics